Alexandros 'Alex' Spontas (born 27 November 2002) is a Cypriot professional footballer who plays as a midfielder for Cypriot First Division club Pafos FC.

Career
Spontas' professional debut took place on 12 April 2021 in a game between Pafos FC and Ermis, as a substitute for Navarone Foor on the 86th minute of the game. Since then, he has made 3 more appearances for the club  against Achna, Karmiotissa.

References 

Living people
2002 births
Cypriot footballers
Association football midfielders
Cypriot First Division players
Pafos FC players